The women's taijiquan two events combined competition (Taijiquan and Taijijian) at the 2006 Asian Games in Doha, Qatar was held from 11 to 13 December at the Aspire Hall 3.

Schedule
All times are Arabia Standard Time (UTC+03:00)

Results
Legend
DNS — Did not start

References

Results

External links
Official website

Women's taijiquan